Suba Thangavelan, also known as S. P. Thangavelan, (born 31 March 1936) is an Indian politician and former minister for slum clearance and Accommodation Control in the Government of Tamil Nadu. He was elected as a member of Tamil Nadu Legislative Assembly from Tiruvadanai constituency in 2011.

Thangavelan was elected to the Tamil Nadu Legislative Assembly as a Dravida Munnetra Kazhagam candidate from Kadaladi constituency in the 1996 and 2006 elections.

Personal life 
Thangavelan was born in Thaniyappuli P. Kodikkulam  on 31 March 1936. He has completed his SSLC education.

References 

1936 births
Dravida Munnetra Kazhagam politicians
State cabinet ministers of Tamil Nadu
Living people
Tamil Nadu MLAs 1996–2001
Tamil Nadu MLAs 2006–2011
Tamil Nadu MLAs 2011–2016